Karacalar is a village in the Gölpazarı District, Bilecik Province, Turkey. Its population is 28 (2021).

References

Villages in Gölpazarı District